Craig Garvey (born 28 April 1993) is an Australian professional rugby league footballer. He previously played for the St. George Illawarra Dragons and Canterbury Bulldogs, was part of the Canberra Raiders squad for 2018 and a short term member of the Sydney Roosters for 2019.

Background
Garvey was born in Sydney, New South Wales, Australia.

He played his junior rugby league for the Earlwood Saints and La Perouse Panthers, before being signed by the St. George Illawarra Dragons.

Playing career

Early career
In 2012 and 2013, Garvey played for the St. George Illawarra Dragons' NYC team.

2013
In 2013, Garvey captained St. George's NYC side. On 20 April, he played for the New South Wales under-20s team against the Queensland under-20s team. On 1 May, he re-signed with St. George Illawarra on a two-year contract. In round 17 of the 2013 NRL season, he made his NRL debut for St. George Illawarra against the Sydney Roosters.

2014
Garvey was named in the St. George squad for the 2014 NRL Auckland Nines.

On 28 February, Garvey was stood down by St. George, later being found to have been guilty to assaulting a man. On 16 December, after consultation and approval from the NRL, St. George Illawarra reinstated him into the full-time first-grade squad.

2015
On 31 January and 1 February 2015, Garvey played for St. George Illawarra in the 2015 NRL Auckland Nines.

On 3 November, Garvey signed a two-year contract with the Canterbury-Bankstown Bulldogs starting in 2016.

2016
On 13 February, Garvey played for the Indigenous All Stars against the World All Stars.

Garvey was named in the Bulldogs' 2016 NRL Auckland Nines squad.

2017
Garvey was named in the Canterbury-Bankstown squad for the 2017 NRL Auckland Nines.

2018
In late 2017, Garvey signed a contract to join the Canberra Raiders for the 2018 season.  Garvey was unable to break into Canberra's first team and spent the majority of the season playing for their feeder team the Mount Pritchard Mounties.  On 1 August, Garvey was released by Canberra with the player citing family reasons as to why the contract was ended.

2019
In 2019, Garvey signed a contract to join reigning premiers the Sydney Roosters.

References

External links

Sydney Roosters profile
Canberra Raiders profile
Canterbury-Bankstown Bulldogs profile
NRL profile

1993 births
Living people
Australian rugby league players
Canterbury-Bankstown Bulldogs players
Illawarra Cutters players
Indigenous All Stars players
Indigenous Australian rugby league players
Rugby league hookers
Rugby league players from Sydney
St. George Illawarra Dragons players